Yazyurdu is a village in the Nusaybin District of Mardin Province in Turkey. The village is populated by Kurds of the Dasikan tribe and had a population of 296 in 2021. The village is Yazidi.

References 

Villages in Nusaybin District
Kurdish settlements in Mardin Province
Yazidi villages in Turkey